Ernest Samuel Reed was a Canadian Anglican bishop in the second half of the 20th century.

Reed was educated at the University of Manitoba and ordained in 1931. He began his ordained ministry with a curacy in Rupertsland and then held incumbencies at Cowansville, Noranda and Montreal after which he was Archdeacon  of Gaspé. From 1954 until his death in 1970 he was the 4th Bishop of Ottawa.

References 

 

University of Manitoba alumni
20th-century Anglican Church of Canada bishops
Anglican archdeacons in North America
Anglican bishops of Ottawa
1970 deaths
Year of birth missing